The Aar Dam and its reservoir, the Aartalsee, lie in the upper Aar valley in the German state of Hesse. Both are in the municipalities of Bischoffen and Hohenahr in the county of Lahn-Dill-Kreis and about 15 km northwest of the town of Gießen in Hesse. On the lakeshores lie the villages of Ahrdt and Mudersbach, both part of the parish of Hohenahr. Since 1991 the dam has impounded the River Aar, a left-hand tributary of the Dill in the Gladenbach Uplands. The reservoir is also fed by the Stadterbach, Wilsbach (into the forebay), Weidbach and Meerbach (into the main reservoir).

Use 

The dam is primarily used for flood protection for the Aar and Dill. In Winter the reservoir is filled to a capacity of 1.33 million m³; in summer this rises to 1.84 million m³. Other uses are: raising low water levels, electricity generation, fishing and recreation. As a result, the dam and reservoir also contribute economically to the region. The reservoir was opened in 1992 as a bathing lake.

Its operator is the county council of Lahn-Dill-Kreis and the Dillgebeit Water Association.

See also 
List of dams in Germany

External links 

 Hessisches Landesamt für Umwelt und Geologie: Der Aartalsee In: Badeseen in Hessen, retrieved 13 May 2009
 The Aartalsee
 Warum der Aartalsee entstand
 Photographs of the Aartalsee

Dams in Hesse
Lahn-Dill-Kreis
SAar Reservoir
Rock-filled dams
1991 establishments in Germany
Hydroelectric power stations in Germany